The Koreatown Immigrant Workers Alliance 한인타운 노동연대 (KIWA, pronounced kee-wah), also known under its past name Korean Immigrant Workers Advocates 남가주 한인 노동 상담소, is a multi-ethnic immigrant worker civil rights membership organization based in the Los Angeles Koreatown area.

KIWA was founded in 1992 by progressive-minded Korean activists who saw class as the basic contradiction of the immigrant communities  in Koreatown. It has since been involved in the aftermath of the 1992 Los Angeles Civil Unrest, campaigns to improve working conditions and immigrant worker empowerment in various Korean ethnic industries, the living wages campaign, and Koreatown's multi-ethnic community developments.

KIWA is perhaps best known recently for its long campaign against Assi Market, the largest ethnic Korean-owned supermarket of the United States, located in Koreatown. Started in the late 1990s, KIWA demands that Assi management rehire dozens of fired Latino and Korean workers who were fired for trying to organize a trade union.

Although initially staffed mostly by ethnic Koreans, KIWA grew to encompass Asian-Pacific American and Latino organizers and members. The Spanish language "Alianza de trabajadores inmigrantes del Barrio Coreano" had been in common use since the early 2000s; however the English language name was officially changed in March 2006 from Korean Immigrant Workers Advocates to Koreatown Immigrant Workers Alliance. The Korean language "한인노동상담소" (Korean Worker's Center) has been changed to 한인타운 노동연대 to signify its geographical focus rather than on an ethnic group.

KIWA is a member organization of MIWON (Multi-Ethnic Immigrant Workers Alliance ), an alliance of four (formerly five) immigrant workers' centers in the Los Angeles area, and ENLACE, a U.S.-Mexico network of workers' centers.

References
Cho, Namju. "Check Out, Not In: Koreana Wilshire/Hyatt Takeover and the Los Angeles Korean Community." Amerasia Journal. 18:1 (1992).
Doherty, Jack. "Activists Train to Aid Korean Workers." Los Angeles Times. July 4, 1993.
Ha, Daisy. "An Analysis and Critique of KIWA's Reform Efforts in the Los Angeles Korean American Restaurant Industry." Asian Law Journal. 8:1 (May 2001).
Hong, Peter Y. "Working for Less." Los Angeles Times. May 7, 1995.
Lee, Hoon. "Displaced and Demanding Justice." Third Force. September/October 1994.
Lee, John. "Real Good Food at a Price." Gidra. Spring 1999.
Nguyen, Tram. "Showdown in K-town." ColorLines. Spring 2001.
Thornburg, Gina. "Koreatown's Workers Find a Voice." The Progressive. July 1998.

External links
official Koreatown Immigrant Workers Alliance website
Koreatown Immigrant Workers Alliance Blog

Anti-corporate activism
Community organizations
Koreatown, Los Angeles
Korean-American culture in Los Angeles
Civic and political organizations of the United States
Non-profit organizations based in California
History of labor relations in the United States
Organizations established in 1992